Pierre Cabanne (September 23, 1921, in Carcassonne – January 24, 2007, in Meudon) was a French art historian. He is best remembered for his extensive research and writings on the art history of painters Rembrandt, Van Gogh, and Picasso. He also authored a book on his interviews with Marcel Duchamp.

References 

1921 births
2007 deaths
French art historians